Gresham Motorsports Park (formerly Jefco Speedway, Georgia International Speedway and Peach State Speedway) is a half-mile (.8 km) paved oval auto racing track in Jefferson, Georgia.  The track opened in 1967, named Jefco Speedway.  Tom Pistone won the inaugural event, a NASCAR Late Model Sportsman race.  Two NASCAR Grand National races were held at the track in 1968 and 1969, won by Cale Yarborough and Bobby Isaac.  Since 1983, the track has held the World Crown 300 for late model stock cars.  The track was renamed Peach State Speedway in the early 1990s.  The circuit was renamed and extensively renovated in 2009. NASCAR started running K&N Pro Series East races in 2010.

NASCAR results
NASCAR Grand National Series races were held in 1968 and 1969. Busch Grand National Series races were held in 1986 and 1987.

Grand National/Cup

Busch Series

Films
The track (then going by the name Georgia International Speedway) was used in filming some parts of the 1982 Six Pack comedy-drama film directed by Daniel Petrie and starring Kenny Rogers, Diane Lane, Erin Gray, Anthony Michael Hall, and Barry Corbin. Some local Jefferson teens were used as extras in the film.

References

External links
Official site
Gresham Motorsports Park archive at Racing-Reference

Buildings and structures in Jackson County, Georgia
Motorsport venues in Georgia (U.S. state)
NASCAR tracks
Tourist attractions in Jackson County, Georgia
1967 establishments in Georgia (U.S. state)